Iridomyrmex mirabilis is a species of ant in the genus Iridomyrmex. Described by Heterick and Shattuck in 2011, the ant is endemic to Australia.

Etymology
The name derives from the Latin language, which translates as 'wonderful', which is in reference to how unique the species looks in comparison to other Iridomyrmex ants.

References

Iridomyrmex
Hymenoptera of Australia
Insects described in 2011